An autopen (or signing machine) is a device used for the automatic signing of a signature. Prominent individuals may be asked to provide their signatures many times a day, such as celebrities receiving requests for autographs, or politicians signing documents and correspondence in their official capacities. Consequently, many public figures employ autopens to allow their signature to be printed on demand and without their direct involvement. 

Though manual precursors of the modern autopen have existed since at least 1803, 21st-century autopens are machines that are programmed with a signature, which is then reproduced by a motorized, mechanical arm holding a pen.

Given the exact verisimilitude to the real hand signature, the use of the autopen allows for a small degree of wishful thinking and plausible deniability as to whether a famous autograph is real or reproduced, thus increasing the perception of the personal value of the signature by the lay recipient. However, known or suspected autopen signatures are also vastly less valuable as philographic collectibles; legitimate hand-signed documents from individuals known to also use an autopen usually require verification and provenance to be considered valid.

Early autopens used a plastic matrix of the original signature which is a channel cut into an engraved plate in the shape of a wheel. A stylus driven by an electric motor followed  the x- and y-axis of a profile or shape engraved in the plate (which is why it is called a matrix). The stylus is mechanically connected to an arm which can hold almost any common writing instrument, so the favourite pen and ink can be used to suggest authenticity. The autopen signature is made with even pressure (and indentation in the paper), which is how these machines are distinguishable from original handwriting where the pressure varies.

History
The first signature duplicating machines were developed by Englishman John Isaac Hawkins. Hawkins received a United States patent for his device in 1803, called a polygraph (an abstracted version of the pantograph), in which the user may write with one pen and have their writing simultaneously reproduced by an attached second pen. Thomas Jefferson used the device extensively during his presidency. This device bears little resemblance to today's autopens in design or operation. The autopen called the Robot Pen was developed in the 1930s, and became commercially available in 1937 (used as a storage unit device, similar in principle to how vinyl records store information) to record a signer's signature. A small segment of the record could be removed and stored elsewhere to prevent misuse. The machine would then be able to mass-produce a template signature when needed.

While the Robot Pen was commercially available, the first commercially successful autopen was developed by Robert M. De Shazo Jr., in 1942. De Shazo developed the technology that became the modern autopen in reference to a Request For Quote (RFQ) from the Navy, and in 1942, received an order for the machine from the Secretary of the Navy. This was the beginning of a significant market in government for the autopen, as the machines soon ended up in the offices of members of Congress, the Senate and the Executive branches. At one point, De Shazo estimated there were more than 500 autopens in use in Washington, D.C.

Use
Individuals who use autopens often do not disclose this publicly. Signatures generated by machines are valued less than those created manually, and perceived by their recipients as somewhat inauthentic. In 2004, Donald Rumsfeld, then the U.S. Secretary of Defense, incurred criticism after it was discovered that his office used an autopen to sign letters of condolence to families of American soldiers who were killed in war. 

Outside of politics, it was reported in November 2022 that some copies of The Philosophy of Modern Song, a book by singer-songwriter Bob Dylan that had been published earlier that month, had been signed with an autopen, resulting in criticism. Autographed editions had been marketed as "hand-signed" and priced at US$600 each. Both Dylan and the book's publisher, Simon & Schuster, issued apologies; refunds were also offered to customers who had bought autopen-signed editions. In addition, Dylan also said that some prints of his artwork sold after 2019 had been signed with an autopen, which he further apologized for and attributed his use of the machine to vertigo and the COVID-19 pandemic, the latter of which prevented him from meeting with staff to facilitate signing the works in question.

U.S. Presidents
It has long been known that the president of the United States uses multiple autopen systems to sign many official documents (e.g., military, diplomatic, and judicial commissions; some Acts of Congress, executive directives, letters and other correspondence), due to the volume of such documents requiring his signature per the U.S. Constitution. Some say Harry Truman was the first president to use the autopen as a way of responding to mail and signing checks. Others credit Gerald Ford as the first president to openly acknowledge his use of the autopen, but Lyndon Johnson allowed photographs of his autopen to be taken while he was in office, and in 1968 the National Enquirer ran them along with the front-page headline "The Robot That Sits In For The President."

While visiting France, Barack Obama authorized the use of an autopen to create his signature which signed into law an extension of three provisions of the Patriot Act. On January 3, 2013, he signed the extension to the Bush tax cuts, using the autopen while vacationing in Hawaii. In order to sign it by the required deadline, his other alternative would have been to have had the bill flown to him overnight. Republican leaders questioned whether this use of the autopen met the constitutional requirement for signing a bill into law, but the validity of presidential use of an autopen had not been actually tested in court. In 2005, George W. Bush asked for and received a favorable opinion from the Department of Justice regarding the constitutionality of using the autopen, but did not use it himself.

Similar devices
Further developing the class of devices known as autopens, Canadian author Margaret Atwood created a device called the LongPen, which allows audio and video conversation between the fan and author while a book is being signed remotely.

See also
 Plotter
 John Hancock
 Rubber stamp (politics)
 Seal (East Asia)
 Telautograph

References

External links 
 A site with information on autopen signatures
 collectSPACE: Identifying Astronaut Autopens

Machines
Identity documents
19th-century inventions
English inventions